Bobiri Forest Reserve and Butterfly Sanctuary is an ecotourism center in Ghana and the only butterfly sanctuary in West Africa. It has about 400 species of butterflies. It is also about 25 minutes drive from the KNUST. It is enclosed by six communities, these are Krofrom, Kubease, Ndobom, Koforidua, Nkwankwaduam and Tsteteseakasum. Bobiri forest also serves as a research reserve and has one of the highest butterfly counts with different species in Ghana.

References

Ashanti Region
Protected areas established in 1931
Protected areas of Ghana
Insectariums